In computer networking and telecommunications, a broadcast communication network is a communication network which uses broadcasting for communication between its nodes. They take messages from a single sender and transmit to all endpoints on the network. For example, Radio, Television, etc.

See also
 Fully connected network
 Multicast
 Switched communication network

Telecommunications engineering